Fay Demont Jackson (February 2, 1888 – January 31, 1959) was a provincial politician from Alberta, Canada. He served as a member of the Legislative Assembly of Alberta from 1940 to 1944, sitting as an independent MLA.

Prior to his election to the legislature, Jackson was a hardware merchant in Etzikom, Alberta, and served on the local school board.

References

Independent Alberta MLAs
1959 deaths
1888 births
People from Mason City, Iowa
American emigrants to Canada
People from the County of Forty Mile No. 8
Alberta school board trustees